Metarctia noctis is a moth of the subfamily Arctiinae. It was described by Herbert Druce in 1910. It is found in Ethiopia.

References

Endemic fauna of Ethiopia
Metarctia
Moths described in 1910
Insects of Ethiopia
Moths of Africa